Percy George Turner (8 August 1879 – 9 October 1954) was an English professional footballer who played in the Football League for Chesterfield, Grimsby Town, Loughborough and Barnsley as an inside forward.

Career statistics

References

1879 births
1954 deaths
Footballers from Leicestershire
English footballers
Association football inside forwards
Loughborough F.C. players
Swindon Town F.C. players
Barnsley F.C. players
Chesterfield F.C. players
Wellingborough Town F.C. players
Brentford F.C. players
Grimsby Town F.C. players
English Football League players
Southern Football League players
Midland Football League players